German submarine U-235 was a Type VIIC U-boat of Nazi Germany's Kriegsmarine during World War II.

Design
German Type VIIC submarines were preceded by the shorter Type VIIB submarines. U-235 had a displacement of  when at the surface and  while submerged. She had two shafts and two  propellers.

U-235 was fitted with five  torpedo tubes (four fitted at the bow and one at the stern), fourteen torpedoes, one  SK C/35 naval gun, 220 rounds, and an anti-aircraft gun. The boat had a complement of between forty-four and sixty.

Service history
The submarine was laid down on 25 February 1942 at the Friedrich Krupp Germaniawerft yard at Kiel as yard number 665, launched on 4 November and commissioned on 19 December under the command of Oberleutnant zur See Goske von Möllendorf.

After training with the 5th U-boat Flotilla at Kiel, U-235 was transferred to the 22nd flotilla on 29 October 1943, following her sinking in May by US bombs in Kiel. She had been raised, repaired and returned to service. She was reassigned to the 31st U-boat Flotilla on 2 April 1945, less than two weeks before her second sinking.

Loss
On 14 April 1945, U-235 was heading to Norway with  when they encountered a small German convoy accompanied by the torpedo boat T17. All vessels had not been warned of the others' presence but the convoy had been warned that a British submarine was in the area. U-1272 dived deep and out of trouble, but U-235 surfaced, possibly to identify herself and then as if changing her mind, also dived. T17 attacked, dropping depth charges. Any celebration on T17 was abruptly stilled when amongst the wreckage appearing were bodies in Kriegsmarine uniform. Forty-six men died; there were no survivors.

References

Bibliography

External links

German Type VIIC submarines
World War II submarines of Germany
World War II shipwrecks in the Kattegat
U-boats commissioned in 1942
U-boats sunk in 1943
U-boats sunk in 1945
U-boats sunk by German warships
1942 ships
Ships built in Kiel
Ships lost with all hands
Friendly fire incidents of World War II
Maritime incidents in May 1943
Maritime incidents in April 1945